Andre Calame is a Swiss figure skater who competed in pair skating.

With partner Eliane Steinemann, he won silver at the 1950 and 1951 European Figure Skating Championships.

Competitive highlights 
With  Eliane Steinemann

References 

Swiss male pair skaters